Swimming was contested at the 2017 Summer Universiade from August 20 to 27 in Taipei, Taiwan. The swimming competitions were held at the National Taiwan Sport University Arena and the New Taipei City Breeze Canal.

Medal summary

Medal table

Men's events

 Swimmers who participated in the heats only and received medals.

Women's events

 Swimmers who participated in the heats only and received medals.

References

External links
2017 Summer Universiade – Swimming 
Result book – Swimming 

 
2017 in swimming
2017 Summer Universiade events
Swimming at the Summer Universiade